The AT&T UNIX PC is a Unix desktop computer originally developed by Convergent Technologies (later acquired by Unisys), and marketed by AT&T Information Systems in the mid- to late-1980s. The system was codenamed "Safari 4" and is also known as the PC 7300, and often dubbed the "3B1". Despite the latter name, the system had little in common with AT&T's line of 3B series computers. The system was tailored for use as a productivity tool in office environments and as an electronic communication center.

Hardware configuration

 10 MHz Motorola 68010 (16-bit external bus, 32-bit internal) with custom, discrete MMU
 Internal MFM hard drive, originally 10 MB, later models with up to 67 MB
 Internal 5-1/4" floppy drive
 At least 512 KB RAM on main board (1 MB or 2 MB were also options), expandable up to an additional 2 MB via expansion cards (4 MB max total)
 32 KB VRAM
 16 KB ROM (up to 32 KB ROM supported using 2x 27128 EPROMs)
 2 KB SRAM (for MMU page table)
 Monochrome green phosphor  monitor
 Internal 300/1200 bit/s modem
 RS-232 serial port
 Centronics parallel port
 3 S4BUS expansion slots
 3 phone jacks

PC 7300
The initial PC 7300 model offered a modest 512 KB of memory and a small, low performance 10 MB hard drive. This model, although progressive in offering a Unix system for desktop office operation, was underpowered and produced considerable fan and drive bearing noise even when idling. The modern-looking "wedge" design by Mike Nuttall was innovative, and the machine gained notoriety appearing in numerous movies and TV shows as the token "computer".

AT&T 3B/1
The cover was redesigned to accommodate a full-height 67 MB hard drive. This cover change added a 'hump' to the case, expanded onboard memory to 1 or 2 MB, as well as added a better power supply.

S/50
Convergent Technologies offered an S/50 which was a re-badged PC 7300.

Olivetti AT&T 3B1
British Olivetti released the "Olivetti AT&T 3B1 Computer" in Europe.

Operating system

The operating system is based on Unix System V Release 2, with extensions from 4.1 and 4.2 BSD, System V Release 3 and Convergent Technologies. The last release was 3.51.

Programming languages
 AT&T BASIC
 dBase III
 GNU C++
 LISP
 LPI C
 LPI COBOL
 LPI DEBUG (debugger)
 LPI Fortran
 LPI Pascal
 LPI PL/I
 Microsoft BASIC
 RM/COBOL
 RM/Fortran
 SMC BASIC
 SVS Fortran
 SVS Pascal

Application software
 Business Graphics (produces chart graphics from 20/20 spreadsheet data)
 dBASE III (DBM)
 Informix (DBM)
 Oracle (DBM)
 Paint Power (drawing package)
 Samna/AT&T Write Power 2 (word processor/spreadsheet)
 Samna Plus (word processor/spreadsheet)
 SMART System (Office Suite)
 Sound Presentations (presentation graphics)

Spreadsheet software
 20/20 (Supercomp 20)
 Microsoft Multiplan

Word processors
 AT&T Word Processor
 Crystal Writer
 Microsoft Word
 Samna Word
 SMART Word Processor
 WordMarc
 WordStar 2000

Games
 Chess
 Klondike
 Life
 Mahjongg
 Larn
 Moria
 NetHack
 Pac-Man clone
 Robots
 Rocks (Asteroids clone)
 Super-Rogue 9.0
 Tetris clone

Utility
 EMACS
 HoneyDanBer UUCP package
 KA9Q (implements SLIP, built-in FTP, telnet, SMTP, finger which are otherwise not available without installing the Ethernet software)
 Kermit
 MGR window system
 Pcomm (ProComm clone)
 SPICE/NUTMEG (circuit simulation tool)
 TeX
 Various Shells: Bourne, C, and Korn

Expansion cards
The UNIX PC has three proprietary S4BUS slots for expansion cards:

 DOS-73 8086 co-processor card running at 8 MHz, Hercules graphics-compatible, with 512 KB RAM, an RS-232 COM2 port and optional 8087 math co-processor. Mouse, floppy, modem (on COM1), and printer are shared in a DOS session. MS-DOS 3.1 was included. This board was designed and built for AT&T by Alloy Computer Products of Framingham, MA.
 RAM could be added using 512 KB RAM or 2 MB RAM cards, up to a maximum of 4 MB (2 MB on the motherboard and 2 MB on expansion cards).
 EIA/RAM combo cards contained extra RAM (512 KB, 1 MB, or 1.5 MB) and two RS-232 serial ports.
 Dual EIA port card (same card as the EIA/RAM but without the RAM sockets)
 StarLAN 1 Mbit/s (1BASE5) network over twisted-pair wire local area network typically used in star format
 Ethernet 10 Mbit/s LAN card (AMD Lance-based) using AUI connector and Wollongong TCP/IP stack/drivers
 AUDIX Voice Power (“Speech Processor”) card allowed for the capture and digital recording of voice conversations. This was an option of the "Integrated Solution" package for the AT&T System 25 PBX where the UNIX PC served as the "Master Controller".
 PC/PBX Connection Package 4 for AT&T PBX System 75 or System 85
 Floppy Tape card provided interface for 23 MB MFM Tape Cartridge Drive (e.g. Cipher FloppyTape 525)
 QIC-02 card for tape backup
 Expansion chassis card was hard-wired to the externally-powered Expansion Unit with five additional S4BUS slots (manufactured by Alloy Computer Products)
 Piiceon Model SR-2048 (2 MB) RAM expansion card

Public domain software
The STORE! was a public domain software repository provided by AT&T and accessible via dialup UUCP.

Emulation

Cancelled successor
Three prototypes of a follow-on "P6" model were alleged to have been built with the specifications claimed to be:
 Motorola 68020
 Optional Motorola 68881 FPU
 SIMM sockets for up to 16 MB RAM
 Color monitor
 2400 baud modem
 60 MB QIC tape

See also
 AT&T 6300 Plus
 Convergent Technologies
 DEC Professional
 IBM RT PC
 IBM System 9000

References

External links
 AT&T Leapfrogs IBM With the Unix PC., InfoWorld, April 15, 1985, pp. 15–17
 The AT&T Unix PC, article from BYTE magazine Volume 10 Number 05: Multiprocessing (May 1985), pp. 98–106
 The AT&T Unix PC Review, article from BYTE magazine Volume 11 Number 05: Multiprocessing (May 1986), pp. 254–262
 comp.sys.3b1 FAQ
 AT&T 3B1/7300 (UNIX PC) Information
 AT&T UNIX PC at old-computers.com
 http://bitsavers.trailing-edge.com/pdf/att/3b1/
 http://www.unixpc.org

Computer-related introductions in 1985
UNIX PC
Computer workstations
68k-based computers
32-bit computers
Articles containing video clips